Hari Kiran Chereddi (born 19 May 1980) is an Indian businessman, Angel Investor and International badminton player. He is the Managing Director of HRV Global LifeSciences. Previously, he served as the Managing Director of Sujana Energy Limited.

Early life and education
Hari Kiran Chereddi was born on 19 May 1980 in Hyderabad, India. He holds a computer science engineer degree from Osmania University and a MBA in supply-chain management and finance from University of California.<

Business career
Chereddi began his career as the Head of Business management operations for Bank of America in India. He set up Sujana Energy, an Energy company that specializes in creating advanced LED lighting solutions, solar products and renewable power generation solutions. Chereddi joined the family business as a executive director of Sriam Labs, a pharmaceutical company, which he expands and sold to Laurus Labs, a company now listed on the NSE and BSE. He is the member of the Confederation of Indian Industry (CII) industry panel on 'Energy & Environment. He is also the  member of National Energy Efficiency Standards Committee and National LED Lightning standards Committee.Hari Kiran Chereddi is the managing director for HRV Global Life Sciences Pvt Ltd. HRV Global Life Sciences honoured with two prestigious Leadership award as the leading pharmaceutical company in India and Middle East.

Badminton
Chereddi is also a prominent Badminton sportsperson who has represented the country in several senior National Championships. His current world ranking is 204 in men’s doubles and 142 in World Tour Ranking Men’s Doubles. He represented India in over 20 International Tournaments across the world.

References

1980 births
Living people
Angel investors
Businesspeople from Hyderabad, India
Osmania University alumni
University of California alumni